Jazy may refer to the following places:
Jazy, Kuyavian-Pomeranian Voivodeship (north-central Poland)
Jazy, Augustów County in Podlaskie Voivodeship (north-east Poland)
Jazy, West Pomeranian Voivodeship (north-west Poland)
Jazy (river), a tributary of the Kara Darya in southern Kyrgyzstan